

Events
 c. 1300 BC – End of Harappan architecture.

Buildings and structures

Buildings
 Ramesses II expands Luxor Temple.
 Abu Simbel constructed.
 Chogha Zanbil built

References 

Architecture